A multiswitch is a device used with a dual or quattro LNB to distribute satellite TV signals to multiple (usually more than four) receivers from a single dish and LNB.

A typical Ku band universal LNB designed for the European market can be switched between four modes (two frequency ranges and two polarisations) selected by signals from the receiver (supply voltage for polarisation and presence or absence of a 22 kHz tone for frequency range). This means that each receiver needs a separate feed and twin-tuner receivers (such as Sky+ and Freesat+) need two separate feeds. For small numbers of receivers a multi-output LNB is used and all the feeds are taken straight from the LNB but there is a limit to the number of outputs that can reasonably be placed on a LNB.

So for larger installations a quattro LNB is used in conjunction with a multiswitch. The quattro LNB provides the signals for all four of the modes at the same time. The multiswitch then selects which of these signals to send to each receiver . For very large installations the signals from the LNB can be split and fed to more than one multiswitch. Typically a larger dish is used to make up for the extra losses in the longer cable runs and the multiswitches.

Some multiswitches can also mix in terrestrial TV and FM radio signals which can then be split out again by a special faceplate (known as a triplexer). Such Integrated Reception Systems allows satellite, TV and radio service to be supplied down a single cable saving on installation costs.

Multiswitches are commonly installed on or in blocks of flats to allow all the residents to receive satellite TV without having to have a separate dish for every resident.

Variations  
Some multiswitches only have two inputs (for one dual LNB), in this case, depending on the voltage supplied by the receiver; either horizontal or vertical polarisation is selected.

 3 input multiswitches are available, which combine a dual LNB with an input from a terrestrial antenna.
 5 input multiswitches are also available, which combine the 4 input "standard" multiswitch with an input from a terrestrial antenna.
 5x8 (5 by 8) Multiswitches, which have 4 satellite input, 1 terrestrial antenna input and 8 outputs
 17x8 (17 by 8) Multiswitches, which have 16 satellite input, 1 terrestrial antenna input and 8 outputs within builtin amplifier for compensating cable losses

North America 
North American frequency assignments differ from those used in Europe and other countries. Typically, the lower half of the Ku band contains communications satellites and free-to-air or ethnic-language programming, using linearly-polarised LNBs; the upper half of the Ku band contains circular-polarised direct broadcast satellite signals.

As North American DBS providers are notorious for forcing proprietary "package" receivers on their subscribers, often with no ability to tune outside the one pay-TV package, the wideband "quattro LNB" able to tune multiple distinct Ku band frequency ranges is uncommon. Most LNB's only have the frequency range needed to tune one DBS provider's signal.
The common LNB types are:
 Ku band (lower), linear, polarisation switched by DC line voltage. These are common for FTA reception, also some earlier StarChoice (Shaw DBS) systems.
 Ku band (lower), linear, both polarisations "stacked" by outputting one set of signals 575 MHz higher than the other. This assumes the band to be tuned is at most 500 MHz wide; these were usually distributed with StarChoice package receivers.
 Ku band (upper), circular polarisation, switched by DC line voltage. The most common North American DBS LNB, these would receive a single DBS satellite (electrically but not mechanically interchangeable between DirecTV, DishNetwork, Bell) and are often dual-output LNBs.
 Ku band (upper), circular polarisation, both polarisations "stacked" by outputting one of the two sets of signals on a higher frequency and frequency-inverted. These would receive both polarisations of a single DBS satellite at once on one cable. The DishNetwork "DishPro" LNB had these characteristics.
 Multiple LNB's in the same package, for use with a pair of satellites in known positions just a few degrees apart, received on a single fixed dish. The individual LNB's in the package may be standard (DC voltage selects polarisation) or stacked (both polarisations output at once, on different frequency). If the package contains a switch, it would either use 22 kHz to switch between two satellites (DirecTV, StarChoice) or use a proprietary switch (EchoStar/DishNetwork). Standards-compliant DiSEQC switches are rare in the North American DBS market, except in free-to-air applications.

The implications for North American DBS multiswitch selection are:
 A single unstacked (polarisation switched by DC line voltage) LNB is compatible with a two- or three-input multiswitch.
 A pair of unstacked (polarisation switched by DC line voltage) LNB's for a two-satellite package is likely compatible with a four- or five-input multiswitch if it is using 22 kHz to switch between the two satellites and if it has at least four outputs.
 A "stacked" LNB (both polarisations output at once on different frequencies) on a single satellite needs only a signal splitter, not a true multiswitch. The splitter must be able to pass DC power from one of the receivers to the LNB without interference.
 A pair of "stacked" LNB's needs a signal splitter on each (able to pass DC power) and switches between the signal splitters and each receiver.
 Any other configuration with multiple LNB's is likely to need proprietary hardware to work with more than one or two receivers.

See also
Crossbar switch - generic description of a switch connecting multiple inputs to multiple outputs in a matrix manner.

Satellite television